Trochactaeon is an extinct genus of fossil sea snails, marine gastropod mollusks in the family Acteonellidae. The genus was named in 1863.

The genus Trochactaeon is known from the Early to the Late Cretaceous epochs.

Species 
Species in the genus Trochactaeon include:
 Trochactaeon conicus - late Cretaceous
 Trochactaeon crisimensis Choffat, 1966

References 

Acteonellidae
Early Cretaceous genus first appearances
Late Cretaceous genus extinctions